The 3rd Chemical Brigade is a training brigade of the United States Army based at Fort Leonard Wood, Missouri, retaining for historic reasons its name.

Organization 

 3rd Chemical Brigade
 Headquarters and Headquarters Battery
  1st Battalion, 48th Infantry Regiment (Basic Combat Training)
  2nd Battalion, 48th Infantry Regiment (Basic Combat Training)
  2nd Battalion, 10th Infantry Regiment (Basic Combat Training)
  3rd Battalion, 10th Infantry Regiment (Basic Combat Training)
  58th Transportation Battalion (Transportation Training)
  84th Chemical Battalion (CBRN Training)

History
The 3rd Chemical Brigade was first constituted on 1 January 1942 as the 3rd Chemical Battalion. It was activated at Fort Benning, Georgia.

The unit was reorganized and redesignated as the 3rd Chemical Mortar Battalion on 11 March 1945. It was inactivated on 2 January 1946 at Camp Patrick Henry, Virginia.

The unit reactivated at Fort Bragg, North Carolina on 18 September 1950, but again inactivated there on 5 February 1953. On 20 September 1989, the unit was disbanded.

The unit reconstituted on 1 October 1999 in the Regular Army and was redesignated as 3rd Chemical Brigade. Command of the unit was transferred to the United States Army Training and Doctrine Command, and activated at Fort Leonard Wood, Missouri.

Campaign participation credit
World War II
Sicily (with arrowhead)
 Naples-Foggia
 Rome-Arno
 Southern France (with arrowhead)
 Rhineland
Ardennes-Alsace
 Central Europe

References

External links
 3rd Chemical Brigade Homepage

003
Military units and formations established in 1942
1942 establishments in Georgia (U.S. state)